Robert M. Frankston (born June 14, 1949) is an American software engineer and businessman who co-created, with Dan Bricklin, the VisiCalc spreadsheet program. Frankston is also the co-founder of Software Arts.

Early life and education
Frankston was born and raised in Brooklyn, New York. He graduated from Stuyvesant High School in New York City in 1966. He earned a S.B degree in computer science and mathematics from the Massachusetts Institute of Technology, followed by a Master of Engineering degree computer science, also from MIT.

Career
Following his work with Dan Bricklin, Frankston later worked at Lotus Development Corporation and Microsoft.

Frankston became an outspoken advocate for reducing the role of telecommunications companies in the evolution of the Internet, particularly with respect to broadband and mobile communications. He coined the term "Regulatorium" to describe what he considers collusion between telecommunication companies and their regulators that prevents change.

Awards and recognition 

Fellow of the Association for Computing Machinery (1994) "for the invention of VisiCalc, a new metaphor for data manipulation that galvanized the personal computing industry"
 MIT William L. Stewart Award for co-founding the M.I.T. Student Information Processing Board (SIPB).
 The Association for Computing Machinery Software System Award (1985)
 The MIT LCS Industrial Achievement Award
 The Washington Award (2001) from the Western Society of Engineers (with Bricklin)
 In 2004, he was made a Fellow of the Computer History Museum "for advancing the utility of personal computers by developing the VisiCalc electronic spreadsheet."

References

External links

Bob Frankston's site/blog
Biographical article from Smart Computing

Stuyvesant High School alumni
1949 births
Living people
People from Brooklyn
Fellows of the Association for Computing Machinery
People from Arlington, Massachusetts